The list of ship decommissionings in 1918 includes a chronological list of ships decommissioned in 1918.  In cases where no official decommissioning ceremony was held, the date of withdrawal from service may be used instead.


See also

References 

1918
Ship decommissionings
Ship decommissionings